Cryptothelea is a genus of moths belonging to the family Psychidae.

The species of this genus are found in Australia and Northern America.

Species:

Cryptothelea acacienta 
Cryptothelea albifrons 
Cryptothelea cardiophora

References

Psychidae
Psychidae genera